Harlan County is a county in the U.S. state of Nebraska. As of the 2020 United States Census, the population was 3,073. Its county seat is Alma. The county is home to the Harlan County Reservoir.

In the Nebraska license plate system, Harlan County is represented by the prefix 51 (it had the 51st-largest number of vehicles registered in the county when the license plate system was established in 1922).

History
Prior to 1870, the portion of the Republican valley that now includes Harlan County was a prized hunting ground for indigenous peoples, and their efforts to keep intruders away deterred white settlement in the area. The defeat of the Sioux at the Battle of Summit Springs in 1869 largely eliminated this threat, and several parties were organized to explore the agricultural possibilities of the area.

A party of forty men from eastern Nebraska settled near the site of present-day Orleans in August 1870. In 1871, a party from the Wyoming Territory, led by Thomas Harlan, settled near present-day Alma, which was named after a settler's daughter.  In that year, Harlan County was separated from Lincoln County by the Nebraska state legislature.  Accounts differ as to the county's namesake: either Thomas Harlan, or James Harlan, who was U.S. Secretary of the Interior between 1865 and 1866.

Geography
The Republican River flows southeastward across the lower part of Harlan County, being impounded by the Harlan County Lake at the SE corner of the county. The terrain consists of gently rolling low hills, with the majority of flat areas being used for center pivot irrigation.

Major highways

  U.S. Highway 6
  U.S. Highway 34
  U.S. Highway 183
  Nebraska Highway 4
  Nebraska Highway 46
  Nebraska Highway 89

Adjacent counties

 Phelps County - north
 Kearney County - northeast
 Franklin County - east
 Phillips County, Kansas - south
 Norton County, Kansas - southwest
 Furnas County - west

Protected areas
 South East Sacramento State Wildlife Management Area
 South Sacramento State Wildlife Management Area

Demographics

As of the 2000 United States Census, there were 3,786 people, 1,597 households, and 1,049 families in the county. The population density was 7 people per square mile (3/km2). There were 2,327 housing units at an average density of 4 per square mile (2/km2). The racial makeup of the county was 98.86% White, 0.13% Black or African American, 0.11% Native American, 0.08% Asian, 0.03% Pacific Islander, 0.16% from other races, and 0.63% from two or more races.  0.77% of the population were Hispanic or Latino of any race.

There were 1,597 households, out of which 25.70% had children under the age of 18 living with them, 59.00% were married couples living together, 4.30% had a female householder with no husband present, and 34.30% were non-families. 30.80% of all households were made up of individuals, and 16.70% had someone living alone who was 65 years of age or older. The average household size was 2.34 and the average family size was 2.93.

The county population contained 24.20% under the age of 18, 5.00% from 18 to 24, 21.60% from 25 to 44, 26.20% from 45 to 64, and 23.00% who were 65 years of age or older. The median age was 44 years. For every 100 females there were 98.00 males. For every 100 females age 18 and over, there were 96.80 males.

The median income for a household in the county was $30,679, and the median income for a family was $36,875. Males had a median income of $27,580 versus $18,411 for females. The per capita income for the county was $15,618. About 7.00% of families and 10.10% of the population were below the poverty line, including 14.40% of those under age 18 and 9.10% of those age 65 or over.

Communities

City
 Alma (county seat)

Villages

 Huntley
 Orleans
 Oxford (partial)
 Ragan
 Republican City
 Stamford

Unincorporated communities
 Mascot
 Oxford Junction

Townships

 Albany
 Alma
 Antelope
 Eldorado
 Emerson
 Fairfield
 Mullally
 Orleans
 Prairie Dog
 Republican City
 Reuben
 Sappa
 Scandinavia
 Spring Grove
 Turkey Creek
 Washington

Politics
Harlan County voters are reliably Republican. In no national election since 1936 has the county selected the Democratic Party candidate.

See also
 National Register of Historic Places listings in Harlan County, Nebraska

References

Further reading
  Field Guide to the Geology of the Harlan County Lake Area, Harlan County, Nebraska — with a History of Events Leading to Construction of Harlan County Dam online pdf
 Rogers, Jean McKee.  History of Harlan County 1870-1967.

External links

 Harlan County Tourism Office

 
Nebraska counties
1871 establishments in Nebraska
Populated places established in 1871